Xenia Township is one of the twelve townships of Greene County, Ohio, United States. As of the 2010 census, the population was 6,537.

Geography
Located at the center of the county, it borders the following townships:
Miami Township - north
Cedarville Township - northeast
New Jasper Township - east
Caesarscreek Township - southeast
Spring Valley Township - southwest
Beavercreek Township - west
Bath Township - northwest

The city of Xenia, the county seat of Greene County, occupies much of Xenia Township, part of the city of Fairborn is in the northwest, and the census-designated place of Wilberforce is located in the township's northeast.

Name and history
Xenia Township was established in 1805.

It is the only Xenia Township statewide.

Government
The township is governed by a three-member board of trustees, who are elected in November of odd-numbered years to a four-year term beginning on the following January 1. Two are elected in the year after the presidential election and one is elected in the year before it. There is also an elected township fiscal officer, who serves a four-year term beginning on April 1 of the year after the election, which is held in November of the year before the presidential election. Vacancies in the fiscal officership or on the board of trustees are filled by the remaining trustees.

Surrounding communities

References

External links
County website

Townships in Greene County, Ohio
Townships in Ohio
1805 establishments in Ohio